The Chemistry and Energy Federation (FCE) is a trade union representing workers in the energy and chemical industries in France.

The union was founded in 1997, when the Gas and Electricity Federation merged with the United Federation of Chemistry.  Like its predecessors, the union affiliated to the French Democratic Confederation of Labour.  By 2017, the union claimed 37,428 members.  In addition to chemicals and energy, it also represents workers in rubber, writing instruments, yachting, paper and cardboard, petroleum, pharmaceuticals, plastics and glass.

References

External links

Chemical industry in France

Chemical industry trade unions
Energy industry trade unions
Trade unions established in 1997
Trade unions in France